Rakovac is a village in Serbia. It is situated in the Beočin municipality which is in the Vojvodina province. Although, the village is geographically located in Syrmia, it is part of the South Bačka District. The village has a Serb ethnic majority and its population numbering 1,989 people as of the 2002 census. Rakovac is divided into two parts: Stari Rakovac ("old Rakovac") and Novi Rakovac ("new Rakovac"). Geographically it is close to the big city of Novi Sad.

History

During the Axis occupation in World War II, 91 civilians were killed in Rakovac by fascists.

Historical population

1961: 1,060
1971: 968
1981: 1,081
1991: 1,375
2002: 1,989
2011: 2,248

See also
Rakovac monastery
List of places in Serbia
List of cities, towns and villages in Vojvodina

References

Miloš Lukić, Putevima slobode - naselja opštine Beočin u ratu i revoluciji, Novi Sad, 1987.
Slobodan Ćurčić, Broj stanovnika Vojvodine, Novi Sad, 1996.

Populated places in Syrmia
South Bačka District
Beočin